Odisha Janmorcha (OJM) is a political party of the Indian state of Odisha led by Pyarimohan Mohapatra.
It was founded on 10 April 2013.
Odisha Janmorcha Party is allotted 'kite' symbol by the Election commission of India.

References

2013 establishments in Odisha
Political parties in Odisha
Political parties established in 2013